Laoshi may refer to:

 The Chinese word for teacher (老師/老师), as transcribed in Hanyu Pinyin.
 Rōshi (Japanese word with the same Chinese characters), an honorific title used for a highly venerated senior teacher in Zen Buddhism.